The 308th Armament Systems Wing (308 ARSW) is an inactive United States Air Force unit. It was last assigned to the Air Armament Center, stationed at Eglin Air Force Base, Florida. It was inactivated on 30 July 2010.

History
 For additional lineage and history, see 308th Armament Systems Group

Strategic Bombardment
In 1951, the 308th was activated as a bombardment unit at Hunter Air Force Base, Savannah, Georgia, and initially equipped with B-29s. Those aircraft were then replaced with new B-47E Stratojet swept-wing medium jet bombers in 1954, capable of flying at high subsonic speeds and primarily designed for penetrating the airspace of the Soviet Union. Also received KC-97 tankers. Over the next eight years, tie 308th conducted strategic bombardment training and air refueling to meet Strategic Air Command's global commitments.

Deployed to bases in North Africa three times, twice in detachment form and once as a unit Sidi Slimane Air Base Morocco, 21 August – 26 October 1956).  From November 1956 to March 1957, the wing tested the SAC alert plan by maintaining one-third of its bomber and tanker force on continuous alert.

The wing was broken up in mid July 1959, for unclear reasons. Part of the unit went to the 2nd Bomb Wing at Hunter Air Force Base, Georgia. The bulk of the wing moved to Plattsburgh Air Force Base, New York on 15 July 1959, where its aircraft were placed under the control of the 380th Bomb Wing. The wing was not operational as one formation from July 1959 to June 1961.

Intercontinental Ballistic Missiles
The Wing was redesignated and activated on 20 November 1961 as the 308th Strategic Missile Wing with Charles Peter O'Sullivan as the first commander. In early 1962 the Air Force established 18 Titan II launch sites at Strategic Air Command's Little Rock Air Force Base, Arkansas. The 308th was reactivated, being organized on 1 April 1962. The wing became fully operational with eighteen sites in December 1963. It gained control over its first missile complex in August 1962 and became fully operational with 18 sites in December 1963. In October 1981, US President Ronald Reagan announced that all Titan II sites would be deactivated by 1 October 1987, as part of a strategic modernization program. The wing completed deactivation on 18 August 1987.

308th Armament Systems Wing
On 23 November 2004 the Air to Ground Munitions Systems Wing was established at Eglin Air Force Base, Florida. It was tasked to design, develop, field and maintain a family of air-to-ground munitions that enhanced United States armed forces strike capabilities. The wing was activated on 27 January 2005. On 3 May 2006 the AGMS Wing was consolidated with the 308th Wing, and the resulting formation was redesignated the 308 Armament Systems Wing on 15 May 2006.

The wing was activated in 2004 to design, develop, field and maintain a family of air-to-ground munitions that enhance warfighter strike capabilities.

The mission of the 308th Armament Systems Wing was to enhance worldwide Air Force combat capability, effectiveness, aircrew survivability, and readiness through joint development, procurement, deployment and sustainment. This mission is executed by air combat test and training systems, expeditionary support equipment, munitions handling equipment and armament subsystems, Explosive Ordnance Disposal support equipment, and realistic Electronic Warfare threat simulators.

The 308 ARSW designed, develops, produces, fields, and sustains a family of air-to-ground and air-to-air munitions, enhancing warfighter capabilities (both U.S. and allies) in defeating a spectrum of enemy targets.

The 308 ARSW was a critical component of the Air Armament Center, which covers the complete weapon-system life-cycle from concept through development, acquisition, experimental testing, procurement, operational testing and final employment in combat.

The wing consisted of over 400 highly qualified personnel trained in the development, test, acquisition, fielding, and operational support of systems such as the Joint Direct Attack Munition (JDAM), Joint Air-to-Surface Standoff Missile (JASSM), Small Diameter Bomb (SDB), Sensor Fuzed Weapon (SFW), Wind Corrected Munitions Dispenser (WCMD) and a host of other specialized programs.

The wing was inactivated on 30 June 2010 and became a directorate to comply with Air Force 2008–2010 Strategic Plan and the CSAF's directive to implement guidelines for new personnel strength standards for units across the Air Force.

Lineage

Established as the 308th Bombardment Wing, Medium on 4 October 1951
 Activated on 10 October 1951
 Inactivated 25 June 1961
Redesignated 308th Strategic Missile Wing (ICBM-Titan), and activated, on 29 November 1961
 Organized on 1 April 1962
 Inactivated 18 August 1987
 Consolidated with the Air to Ground Munitions Systems Wing as the Air to Ground Munitions Systems Wing on 3 May 2006

Established as Air to Ground Munitions Systems Wing on 23 November 2004
 Activated on 27 January 2005
 Consolidated with the 308th Strategic Missile Wing on 3 May 2006
 Redesignated: 308th Armament Systems Wing on 15 May 2006
 Inactivated on 30 June 2010

Assignments
38th Air Division, 10 October 1951
 Attached to 21st Air Division, 10 October 1951 – 17 April 1952
 Attached to 5th Air Division, 21 August-c. 26 October 1956
820th Air Division, 15 July 1959 – 25 June 1961
Strategic Air Command, 29 November 1961
825th Air (later, 825th Strategic Aerospace) Division, 1 April 1962
42d Air Division, 1 January 1970
17th Strategic Aerospace Division, 31 March 1970
12th Strategic Missile (later, 12 Air) Division, 30 June 1971
42nd Air Division, 1 April 1973
19th Air Division, 1 December 1982 – 18 August 1987
Air Armament Center, 27 January 2005 – 30 June 2010

Components
Groups
308th Bombardment Group: 10 October 1951 – 16 June 1952 (not operational)
308th, 328th, 408th, 708th, 728th Armament Systems Groups (present)

Squadrons
303d Air Refueling Squadron: attached 1 February 1956 – 15 July 1959
308th Air Refueling Squadron: 8 July 1953 – 15 June 1959 (detached 1–21 June 1954, 5 January-4 March 1956, and 2 April-2 July 1958)
373d Bombardment (later, 373d Strategic Missile) Squadron: attached 10 October 1951 – 15 June 1952 (not operational, 10 October-5 November 1951), assigned 16 June 1952 – 25 June 1961 (not operational, 15 July 1959 – 25 June 1961); assigned 1 April 1962 – 18 August 1987
374th Bombardment (later, 374th Strategic Missile) Squadron: attached 10 October 1951 – 15 June 1952 (not operational, 10 October-5 November 1951), assigned 16 June 1952 – 25 June 1961 (not operational, 15 July 1959 – 25 June 1961); assigned 1 September 1962 – 15 August 1986
375th Bombardment Squadron: attached 10 October 1951 – 15 June 1952 (not operational, 10 October-13 November 1951), assigned 16 June 1952 – 25 June 1961 (not operational, 15 July 1959 – 25 June 1961)
425th Bombardment Squadron: 1 October 1958 – 25 June 1961 (not operational, 15 July 1959 – 25 June 1961).

Stations

Forbes Air Force Base, Kansas, 10 October 1951
Hunter Air Force Base, Georgia, 17 April 1952
Plattsburgh Air Force Base, New York, 15 July 1959 –  25 June 1961
Little Rock Air Force Base, Arkansas, 1 April 1962 – 18 August 1987
Eglin Air Force Base, Florida, 27 January 2005 – 30 June 2010

Aircraft and Missiles
Consolidated B-24 Liberator, 1942–1945
Boeing B-29 Superfortress, 1946–1951, 1951–1952, 1952–1953
Boeing B-47 Stratojet, 1953–1954, 1954–1959
Boeing KC-97 Stratofreighter, 1953–1959
LGM-25C Titan II, 1963–1987

See also

List of B-47 units of the United States Air Force

References

Notes

Bibliography

Further reading

External links
308 Strategic Missile Wing Memorial Website

Military units and formations in Florida
Military units and formations established in 1951
0308
1951 establishments in Kansas
2010 disestablishments in Florida